Mike Fleming was a conservative radio talk show host in Memphis, Tennessee. He was a commentator of the traditional journalistic school with an enhanced personality. Mr. Fleming had more than three decades of journalism experience, having worked for several prominent Tennessee and Florida newspapers.

The most common topics of his show, which aired from 4 to 7 p.m. CST on WREC, were reserved for the city government, in particular Mayor W. W. Herenton and House Speaker Jimmy Naifeh, whom he routinely referred to as "King Willie" and "Neanderthal Naifeh" for their alleged abuses of government and ethical violations. He also strongly criticized the powerful political Ford family, particularly former state senator John Ford and former U.S. Representative Harold Ford, Jr.

On 28 April 2009, Clear Channel Communications Inc., the largest owner of U.S. radio stations, said it was cutting 590 jobs, including some on-air personalities, including Fleming.

References

External links
A link to Fleming's parent company, WREC 600, as well as his blog

Year of birth missing (living people)
Living people
People from Memphis, Tennessee
American talk radio hosts